Kala Deo is a village located in the Northern Punjab in Pakistan close to the Jhelum River. 
Geographical location: Jhelum, Punjab, Pakistan, Asia
geographical coördinates: 32° 59' 0" North, 73° 46' 0" East about 60 mi (or 96 km) South-East of Islamabad, the country's capital.

The village is mainly known for the masjid Khanquia-E-Sultania which is believed to have been built around the year 1960, by a family of Islamic Scholars displaced during the construction of Mangla Dam.

The masjid is named after Sultania, the household in Kala Deo which these Scholars resided at prior to the construction of Khanquia-E-Sultania.

The land upon which the original Mosque and grounds lie was donated by the Sultania household of Kala Deo to support the building of the Khanquia-E-Sultania.

After the death of Sultania he was buried inside the masjid grounds.  In the time since, other descendents of this household have too been buried there.

Populated places in Jhelum District